Anna Ida Holmlund (born 3 October 1987) is a Swedish former ski cross athlete.

Career 
Holmlund won 19 World Cup races and three ski cross World Cups up to 2016. She came sixth at the 2010 Winter Olympics and won the bronze medal at the 2014 Winter Olympics. She won a bronze medal at the 2011 FIS Freestyle World Ski Championships.

During a practice run on 19 December 2016 in Innichen, Holmlund crashed and suffered head injuries with brain hemorrhages and facial fractures, including a diffuse axonal injury. Doctors put her in a medically induced coma in a hospital in Bolzano and a week later she was flown back to Sweden. In May 2017, the Swedish Ski Association announced that Holmlund had regained consciousness and had communicated with and recognised friends and family. In July 2017, she left the Danderyd hospital, where she had been treated, and returned to her hometown of Sundsvall.

In December 2017, Holmlund took her first steps since the accident. She made a return to the ski slopes in February 2018, when she took to the snow in a sit-ski for the first time. In April 2018, she made a return to competition by racing in a biski with the assistance of her brother Kalle: they won the women's class in a downhill race in Åre.

In early November 2018, Holmlund was announced as an ambassador for Stockholm's bid for the 2026 Winter Olympics.

World Cup podiums

References

External links 
 
 

Freestyle skiers at the 2010 Winter Olympics
Freestyle skiers at the 2014 Winter Olympics
1987 births
Living people
Olympic freestyle skiers of Sweden
Swedish female freestyle skiers
Medalists at the 2014 Winter Olympics
Olympic bronze medalists for Sweden
Olympic medalists in freestyle skiing
People from Sundsvall
People with brain injuries
Sportspeople from Västernorrland County
21st-century Swedish women